Awqat Faragh  is a 2006 Egyptian film about a group of Middle Class youths and their experiences growing up and dealing with drugs and sex. The film was the first appearance for actors Ahmed Hatem, Karim Kassem and Amr Abed.

Synopsis
A group of Middle Class youths, some of whom are liberal and some conservative, all live lives filled with troubles. They make decisions that will impact their futures. The film starts and ends in an amusement park and in between, the group tries to achieve their dreams but learn the harsh realities of life and many other things.

Cast
 Randa El-Behairy as Menna
 Ahmed Hatem as Hazem
 Karim Kassem as Amr
 Amr Abed as Ahmed
 Ahmed Hadad as Tarek 
 Safaa Tag El-Din as Mai
 Hanan Youssef as Ahmed's Mother 
 Mohammed Abu Dawud as Menna's Father
 Tarek El-Telmissany as Hazem's Father
 Khalil Morsy Ahmed's Father
 Muhammad Mamdouh as Hazem's brother

References

External links

Egyptian drama films
2000s Arabic-language films
2006 films